The 1998–99 Chicago Bulls season was the franchise's 33rd season in the National Basketball Association. On March 23, 1998, the owners of all 29 NBA teams voted 27–2 to reopen the league's collective bargaining agreement, seeking changes to the league's salary cap system, and a ceiling on individual player salaries. The National Basketball Players Association (NBPA) opposed to the owners' plan, and wanted raises for players who earned the league's minimum salary. After both sides failed to reach an agreement, the owners called for a lockout, which began on July 1, 1998, putting a hold on all team trades, free agent signings and training camp workouts, and cancelling many NBA regular season and preseason games. Due to the lockout, the NBA All-Star Game, which was scheduled to be played in Philadelphia on February 14, 1999, was also cancelled. However, on January 6, 1999, NBA commissioner David Stern, and NBPA director Billy Hunter finally reached an agreement to end the lockout. The deal was approved by both the players and owners, and was signed on January 20, ending the lockout after 204 days. The regular season began on February 5, and was cut short to just 50 games instead of the regular 82-game schedule.

The Bulls entered the season as the three-time defending NBA champions, having defeated the Utah Jazz in the 1998 NBA Finals in six games, winning their sixth NBA championship, and completing a second three-peat in the 1990s. However, with Phil Jackson's resignation as head coach, the departures of Scottie Pippen (who was traded to the Houston Rockets), Dennis Rodman (who signed with the Los Angeles Lakers as a free agent), and Michael Jordan announcing his retirement for the second time on January 13, 1999, during the latter stages of the lockout, it marked the end of the Bulls dynasty in the 1990s.

Under new head coach Tim Floyd, plus the off-season acquisitions of Brent Barry, Mark Bryant, and Andrew Lang, the Bulls were a shell of their former selves, losing eight of their first nine games of the season. The team lost 14 of their final 17 games, and finished in last place in the Central Division with a 13–37 record (roughly the equivalent of 21–61), missing the playoffs for the first time since 1984. Toni Kukoč led the team with 18.8 points, 7.0 rebounds, and 5.3 assists per game, while Ron Harper averaged 11.2 points and 1.7 steals per game, and Barry contributed 11.1 points per game. In addition, Dickey Simpkins showed improvement averaging 9.1 points and 6.8 rebounds per game, while Bryant provided the team with 9.0 points and 5.2 rebounds per game, and Randy Brown contributed 8.8 points and 1.7 steals per game. The Bulls were just the second defending champions to miss the postseason, behind the 1969–70 Boston Celtics.

On April 10, 1999, the Bulls set an all-time NBA record low for points in the shot clock era in an 82–49 loss at the United Center to the Miami Heat. Following the season, Barry was traded to the Seattle SuperSonics, while Harper signed as a free agent with the Los Angeles Lakers to reunite with Jackson, who was hired to coach the Lakers, Bryant signed with the Cleveland Cavaliers, and Lang and Bill Wennington were both released to free agency.

Offseason

NBA Draft

Roster

Roster Notes
 Small forward Jeff Sanders missed the entire season due to injury.

Regular season

Season standings

Record vs. opponents

Player statistics

NOTE: Please write the players statistics in alphabetical order by last name.

Awards and records
In a home game against the Miami Heat on April 10, the Bulls scored 49 points, the fewest by any team since the shot clock was introduced in 1954.

Transactions

References

External links
 Bulls on Database Basketball
 Bulls on Basketball Reference
 

Chicago Bulls seasons
Chic
Chicago
Chicago